The West End Centre is an entertainment venue and arts centre located on Queens Road in Aldershot. The centre hosts classes, workshops, art exhibitions, music performances (of heavy metal, blues, folk and punk music), stand-up comedy, and small-scale and intimate theatre.

Background

Opening in 1975 in the former West End Junior School once attended by comedian Arthur English, the West End Centre (or the 'Westy') is described as "the creative hub of Aldershot and the surrounding areas". It was originally run by volunteers and faced closure in its early years until the Poet Laureate John Betjeman had the building locally listed. The Graeae Theatre Company was based at the Centre from 1981 to 1982.

When managed by Hampshire County Council the centre faced closure again in 2007 until public protests forced the decision to be reversed. Every year since 2006 the West End Centre has held the Summer Westival which creates an indoor music festival complete with real grass throughout the venue.

Performers who have appeared at the centre include Andy Parsons, Matt Forde, Sam Simmons, Roger McGough, Seann Walsh, Stewart Lee, Adrian Henri, Shappi Khorsandi, Miriam Margolyes, Omid Djalili, Dara Ó Briain, Jimmy Carr, Dave Gorman, Tony Hawks Daniel Kitson, Simon Munnery, Nish Kumar, Phill Jupitus, Justin Moorhouse, Pete Firman and Al Murray.

Bands who have appeared at the WEC include Blur, Happy Mondays, Stone Roses, Spiritualized, A, Primal Scream, Manic Street Preachers, Peter Green, Chas & Dave, Foals, The 1975, Biffy Clyro, The Temperance Movement, Nine Below Zero, Funeral for a Friend, PJ Harvey, The Xcerts and We Are the Ocean. The Centre has also provided support for local musicians Hundred Reasons and Sonny Black.

Today the Centre is managed by Hampshire Cultural Trust as an arts centre and venue for professional touring shows, the theatre space having a capacity of 106 with raked seating. From  2001 to 2019 the arts centre director was Barney Jeavons, the former manager of the British rock band Reuben and the son of the actor Colin Jeavons.

Gallery

See also
Princes Hall
Hippodrome, Aldershot
Theatre Royal, Aldershot

References

External list

1975 establishments in England
Buildings and structures in Aldershot
Aldershot
Studio theatres in England
Entertainment venues in England
Arts centres in England
Music venues in Hampshire